County Council elections were held in Trinidad and Tobago on 28 October 1946, alongside general elections.

Background
Constitutional arrangements for local elections in Trinidad and Tobago were made in 1946. Five leaflets were delivered to voters, explaining voter registration, the new county councils and the voting procedure.

Electoral system
The County Council elections used the same districts as the Legislative Council, but with each constituency electing two members instead of one.

Results

Elected members

References

1946
1946 in Trinidad and Tobago
Trinidad and Tobago